Robert Lee Nash (born August 24, 1950) is an American college basketball coach and the former head men's basketball coach at the University of Hawaii at Manoa.

Career
A 1968 graduate of Hartford Public High School, Nash played college basketball for the UH-Manoa in the early 1970s and was a member of the school's most successful men's basketball team up to the time.

Nash played professionally during the 1970s as a member of the Detroit Pistons, San Diego Conquistadors and Kansas City Kings. He then became an assistant coach at Hawaii in 1987 and held that position until he was promoted to head coach in 2007, taking over for retired Riley Wallace in April 2007 and was fired after the 2009–10 season. He had a 34–56 record as head coach over his three seasons at the helm.

Nash was inducted into the Hartford Public High School Hall of Fame in 2004.

He became the head coach of the Saitama Broncos in the bj league in Japan in 2010, where his son Bobby also played. Nash left the team after the March 11 Japanese earthquake as the team shut down for the rest of the season. Nash served as the head coach for the Toyama Grouses in the bj league from 2012–2017.

Head coaching record

|- 
| style="text-align:left;"|Saitama Broncos
| style="text-align:left;"|2010-11
| 38||14||24|||| style="text-align:center;"|-|||-||-||-||
| style="text-align:center;"|-
|-
| style="text-align:left;"|Toyama Grouses
| style="text-align:left;"|2012-13
| 52||35||17|||| style="text-align:center;"|3rd in Eastern|||6||3||3||
| style="text-align:center;"|Lost in 2nd round
|-
| style="text-align:left;"|Toyama Grouses
| style="text-align:left;"|2013-14
| 52||42||10|||| style="text-align:center;"|1st in Eastern|||4||2||2||
| style="text-align:center;"|3rd place
|-
| style="text-align:left;"|Toyama Grouses
| style="text-align:left;"|2014-15
| 52||35||17|||| style="text-align:center;"|5th in Eastern|||2||0||2||
| style="text-align:center;"|Lost in 1st round
|-
| style="text-align:left;"|Toyama Grouses
| style="text-align:left;"|2015-16
| 52||39||13|||| style="text-align:center;"|1st in Eastern|||6||5||1||
| style="text-align:center;"|Eastern Champions
|-
| style="text-align:left;"|Toyama Grouses
| style="text-align:left;"|2016-17
| 60||18||42|||| style="text-align:center;"|5th in Central|||-||-||-||
| style="text-align:center;"|-
|-
| style="text-align:left;"|Rizing Zephyr Fukuoka
| style="text-align:left;"|2018-19
| 53||12||41|||| style="text-align:center;"|6th in Western|||-||-||-||
| style="text-align:center;"|relegated to B2
|-

References

External links
Bob Nash. basketball-reference

1950 births
Living people
African-American basketball coaches
African-American basketball players
Alviks BK players
American expatriate basketball people in Japan
American men's basketball players
Basketball coaches from Connecticut
Basketball players from Hartford, Connecticut
Detroit Pistons draft picks
Detroit Pistons players
Hawaii Rainbow Warriors basketball coaches
Hawaii Rainbow Warriors basketball players
Hawaii Volcanos players
Kansas City Kings players
Rizing Zephyr Fukuoka coaches
Saitama Broncos coaches
San Diego Conquistadors players
San Jacinto Central Ravens men's basketball players
Small forwards
Sportspeople from Hartford, Connecticut
Toyama Grouses coaches
21st-century African-American people
20th-century African-American sportspeople